"The Classical Annex" is a short story by E. M. Forster, written in 1930–1931 and published posthumously in The Life to Come (and Other Stories) in 1972.

External links 
Plot Summary

Classical Annex, The
Short stories by E. M. Forster